The Accidentals are an all-male collegiate a cappella group. Formed in 1974, the Accidentals are the oldest a cappella group at the University of Georgia.  The Accidentals are typically anywhere from 12 to 17 members and hold auditions every fall and occasionally at the end of the spring

History 

The Accidentals were formed in 1974 when the Director of The University of Georgia Men's University of Georgia Men's Glee Club, Dr. E. Pierce Arant, Jr. decided to liven up the concerts a bit by having a feature quartet. Over time the quartet grew to eight members, then twelve. In the mid-1980s Paul Tate joined the group and began to arrange more contemporary pop music for the group, a big change from the typical barbershop and spiritual music the group was used to doing with the Men's Glee Club. The Accidentals were widely heralded for their 1992 performance of "A Mighty Fortress" as arranged by the group Glad.

Paul Tate took up the Directorship of the Accidentals in 1993 and proceeded to whip the 12 members into shape. That year also brought about a landmark event: the Accidentals' first album, On The Map, which was only available on cassette, and sold out quickly. The group put out their second album the next year: S.O.L.D. O.U.T. (Songs Of Liberty, Devotion, and Other Universal Truths). The album was a great improvement over On The Map and gave the Accidentals a more polished and professional sound. The next year brought the Accidentals' third album in three years: Songs From Uncle Paul's Cabin.

In the spring of 1996, the Accidentals' first annual Invitational concert, UGAPALOOZA! The guest groups included The UNC Tar Heel Voices and The William & Mary Gentlemen of the College. In 1997 the Accidentals competed in their first a cappella competition, the southeast regional of The National Championship of Collegiate A Cappella (now the International Championship of Collegiate A Cappella), and walked away with First Place, and a Best Arrangement Award for Paul Tate's "Blessing."

In January 2001 the Accidentals released their first Christmas album, Meanwhile, Back at Christmas..., which was recorded live at the Accidentals' Christmas Concert in Edge Recital Hall on December 2, 2000.

Since 2000 the Accidentals have shifted their musical style away from their Glee Club origins towards a more contemporary pop sound, while also becoming completely student directed. They have been a continuous presence in Varsity Vocals International Championship of Collegiate A Cappella, and have continuously grown and improved as competitors each year they competed, culminating with ICCA Finals appearances in 2010, where they received 3rd place overall, and 2012. The Accidentals have used their experiences and success in ICCAs to meet and connect with other a cappella groups around the country, and have frequently been guest groups at colleges all across the southeast and up the east coast. They have also released several pop albums over the years:PDA (Public Displays of A Cappella) (2000), None of the Above (2004), 14 and Change (2006), Imprint (2009), A Gentleman's Game (2011), and Tune Down For What (2014).

Albums 

 On The Map (1993)
 S.O.L.D. O.U.T. (Songs Of Liberty, Devotion, and Other Universal Truths) (1994)
 A Patriotic Medley
 Si Iniquitates
 We Shall Walk Through the Valley In Peace
 Be Thou My Vision
 Wonderful Invention
 I Want To Hold Your Hand
 You Never Let Me Down
 In The Still Of The Night
 Down Over The Hill
 Don't Pull Your Love
 Without You
 Blessing
 Songs From Uncle Paul's Cabin (1995)
 Behold Man
 Crucifixus
 Lazarus Unwound
 Colorado Trail
 When I'm Sixty-Four
 Somebody
 She Is My Slender Small Love
 The First Noel
 Lo, How A Rose E'er Blooming
 Psallite!
 Good Lovin'
 Conjunction Junction
 You Don't Love Me Anymore
 Bad Case of Lovin' You
 Take A Chance On Me
 PDA (Public Displays of A Cappella) (2000)
 We Won't Sing That Way
 Up The Ladder
 I Wanna Hold Your Hand
 Every Time You Go Away
 Sweet Little Jesus Boy
 Kyrie
 Jessie's Girl
 Faith
 Change In My Life
 Prayer of The Children
 We Won't Sing That Way (Live)
 Meanwhile, Back At Christmas... (2001)
 Break Forth, O Heavenly Light
 I'll Be Home For Christmas
 Lo, How A Rose E'er Blooming
 Holiday Road
 Sweet Little Jesus Boy
 All My Lovin'
 The First Noel
 Up The Ladder
 Silent Night
 Change In My Life
 Oh Holy Night
 Twelve Days of Christmas
 Gaelic Blessing
 None Of The Above (2004) - produced by Diovoce, Inc.
 It's Alright
 Walking In Memphis
 Hard To Say Goodbye
 Let's Get It On
 Tears In Heaven
 Still The One
 Take Me As I Am
 Boogie Shoes (Remix)
 Dixieland Delight
 When You Come Back Down
 Take Me Home Tonight
 14 And Change (2006) – produced by James Gammon
 Wish You Were Here
 Better Man
 Another Day In Paradise
 Grey Street
 The Freshman
 Don't Lie
 Back To You
 Ain't No Sunshine
 Can't Stop
 Iris
 Let That Be Enough
 Bad
 Georgia Medley
 Blessing
 Imprint (2009) – produced by Charlie Forkish
 Life Is a Highway
 Barrel of a Gun
 Violet Hill
 Rains In Asia
 Warning
 Nothing In My Way
 Everything
 Cupid's Chokehold
 On a Night Like This
 Lovestoned
 Acoustic #3
 Through With You
 Lullaby
 A Gentleman's Game (2011) – produced by A Cappella Records
 Don't You Worry 'Bout A Things
 Have It All
 She's Country
 Comin' Home Baby
 Bad Things
 Crawl
 Come Together
 A Change Is Gonna Come
 One Day
 Lips Like Sugar
 Use Somebody
 I Shall Not Walk Alone
 We All Need Saving (iTunes exclusive)
 Doug's Song (iTunes exclusive)
 Tune Down For What (2014)
 Never Say Never
 14th Street
 I Can't Make You Love Me
 Hold My Hand
 Bridge Over Troubled Water
 China Grove
 Something To Believe In

Awards 
International Championship of Collegiate A Cappella
 1997 Quarterfinals: Champion
 1997 Quarterfinals: Best Arrangement – Paul Tate for "Blessing"
 1998 Quarterfinals: Best Arrangement – Josh Byrd for "We Won't Sing That Way"
 2005 Quarterfinals: Runner-Up
 2005 Quarterfinals: Outstanding Vocal Percussion – Travis Barron and Taylor Gray
 2005 Semifinals: Outstanding Vocal Percussion – Travis Barron and Taylor Gray
 2007 Quarterfinals: Runner-Up
 2007 Semifinals: 3rd Place
 2007 Semifinals: Best Arrangement – Yannick Morgan for "Ain't No Sunshine"
 2009 Quarterfinals: Champion
 2009 Quarterfinals: Outstanding Arrangement: Kiley Dorton and Kirby Duncan for "Come Together"
 2009 Quarterfinals: Outstanding Vocal Percussion: Schafer Gray for "Come Together"
 2009 Semifinals: Runner-Up
 2009 Semifinals: Outstanding Vocal Percussion: Schafer Gray
 2010 Quarterfinals: Champion
 2010 Quarterfinals: Outstanding Vocal Percussion: Schafer Gray for "Come Together"
 2010 Semifinals: Champion
 2010 Finals: 3rd Place
 2010 Finals: Outstanding Soloist: Langdon Quin for "Come Together"
 2010 Finals: Outstanding Vocal Percussion: Schafer Gray of the Accidentals
 2012 Quarterfinals: Champion
 2012 Quarterfinals: Outstanding Soloist: Andy Moon for "Bridge Over Troubled Water"
 2012 Quarterfinals: Outstanding Arrangement: Stephen Hutchings for "Bridge Over Troubled Water"
 2012 Semifinals: Champion
 2012 Semifinals: Outstanding Vocal Percussion: Schafer Gray
 2012 Finals: Outstanding Vocal Percussion: Schafer Gray
 2014 Quarterfinals: Runner-Up
 2014 Quarterfinals: Outstanding Soloist: Gemille Walker for "Say So"
 2014 Quarterfinals: Outstanding Choreography: Nehemiah Lawson for "Say So"
 2016 Quarterfinals: Runner-Up
 2016 Quarterfinals: Outstanding Soloist: Tony Rhone for "Edge of Heaven" 
 2021 Quarterfinals: Champion
 2021 Quarterfinals: Outstanding Soloists: Blaine Alligood for "Slow Dancing in the Dark" and Grant Allen for "Prisoner"
 2021 Quarterfinals: Outstanding Mix: Grant Allen for the entire set

SOJAM A Cappella Festival
 2009 Audience Favorite Award
 2009 Runner-Up
 2009 Best Choreography
 2009 Outstanding Soloist: Marcus Hines for "Don't You Worry 'Bout A Thing"

Notes

Collegiate a cappella groups
University of Georgia
Musical groups established in 1974
1974 establishments in Georgia (U.S. state)